Gbêkê Region (also known as Wawlè Region) is one of the 31 regions of Ivory Coast. Since its establishment in 2011, it has been one of two regions in Vallée du Bandama District. The seat of the region is Bouaké and the region's population in the 2021 census was 1,352,900, making it the third-most populous region of Ivory Coast.

Gbêkê is currently divided into four departments: Béoumi, Botro, Bouaké, and Sakassou.

Name
In the 2011 decree that created the region, Gbêkê was referred to alternatively as the region of "Wawlè".

Location
Gbêkê is located in the north of the country, it borders Hambol, Iffou, Bélier Region, Marahoué and Béré Region

Notes

 
Regions of Vallée du Bandama District
States and territories established in 2011
2011 establishments in Ivory Coast